Echinodontium ryvardenii is a  species of fungus in the family Echinodontiaceae. Described as new to science in 1998, it is found in Sardinia (Italy), where it grows parasitically on the trunks and old branches of Juniperus phoenicea. The specific epithet honors mycologist Leif Ryvarden.

References

External links
 

Fungi described in 1998
Fungi of Europe
Fungal plant pathogens and diseases
Russulales